Bisaltes roseiceps is a species of beetle in the family Cerambycidae. It was described by Breuning in 1939.

References

roseiceps
Beetles described in 1939